Naduvakurichi is a village in Thoothukudi district in the Indian state of Tamil Nadu.

References 

 Naduvakurichi Pin

Villages in Thoothukudi district